International Class is a status that the World Sailing grants, in exchange for fees of various kinds, to sailing boat classes that offered a “high standard of international competitive sailing” and satisfy a number of criteria regarding the number of boats of that class, their international distribution, and the rules, administration and operation of that class's Class Association. Some of them are an Olympic sailing class.

Classes are grouped following seven categories of sailing classes.

References

External links
  International Sailing Federation
  Criteria applied by ISAF to designate International and Recognized Classes
 International Association for Disabled Sailing (IFDS)

Classes of World Sailing